The 1973 LSU Tigers football team represented Louisiana State University (LSU) during the 1973 NCAA Division I football season.  Under head coach Charles McClendon, the Tigers had a record of 9–3 with a Southeastern Conference record of 5–1. It was McClendon's twelfth season as head coach at LSU.

Schedule

Roster

References

LSU
LSU Tigers football seasons
LSU Tigers football